Baldovenci is a village in the Mariovo region, in the municipality of Novaci, North Macedonia. It used to be part of the former municipality of Staravina.

History
One kilometer east of Baldovenci is the archaeological site Arbanasinovac, dating from the Iron Age. The name stems from Arbanas, the old South Slavic ethnonym for Albanian, suggesting either direct linguistic contact with Albanians or the former presence of an assimilated Albanian community.

According to Vasil Kanchov, Baldovenci has 185 residents, all Bulgarian Exarchists. In 1905, per Dimitar Mishev, the village population was 136 Bulgarian Exarchists.

The last census in which Baldovenci recorded inhabitants was in 1961 with 170.

References

Villages in Novaci Municipality